The 2020 British Speedway Championship was the 60th edition of the British Speedway Championship. The competition was cut short due to the coronavirus pandemic, with the semi-finals being cancelled. The final was originally set to take place at Ipswich with limited fans in attendance, however it was later switched to the National Speedway Stadium in Manchester. due to bad weather Defending champion Charles Wright decided not to defend his title.

The final was won by Australian Rory Schlein, who rode under an ACU (British) licence. He beat Richard Lawson and former three-time world champion Jason Crump, who also rode under an ACU (British) licence, in the final.

Results

The Final 
  National Speedway Stadium, Manchester
 28 September 2020

Dan Thompson replaced Edward Kennett in the meeting.Chris Harris was a non starter in his first ride.Josh Bates retired in his first two rides.Dan Thompson retired in his first ride.Ritchie Worrall fell in the semi final whilst in second place.

See also 
 British Speedway Championship

References 

British Speedway Championship
British
Speedway
British Speedway Championship
British Speedway Championship
Sports competitions in Manchester